Agaricochara is a genus of beetle belonging to the family Staphylinidae.

The genus was first described by Kraatz in 1856.

The species of this genus are found in Europe and Northern America.

Species:
 Agaricochara latissima (Stephens, 1832)

References

Aleocharinae
Aleocharinae genera